Descent magazine is a bi-monthly British and Irish full-colour print magazine dedicated to caving. It has been in print since 1969, first as a small format magazine and then, from 1977 onwards, in A4 format.

The publication is 'written by cavers, for cavers' and features high quality photographs and articles related to underground exploration. As well as the major features, Descent maintains a network of correspondents in each of the caving regions of the UK and Ireland. The correspondents gather reports on the latest caving discoveries and other caving news for their area.

Bruce Bedford was editor from 1969 until 1988. Chris Howes then began to work as editor and bought it from its previous publisher, Gloster Publications, in 1998, bringing it to his and Judith Calford's company, Wild Places Publishing. In 2022, after 34 years and 204 issues as editor, Chris and Judith stepped down with their final issue being for October 2022. As of October 2022, the editor is Chris Scaife working in partnership with Carolina Smith. Chris and Carolina are the owners of Kendal-based Stalactite Publishing.

See also 
 Caving in the United Kingdom

References

External links
Magazine website
Wild Places Publishing website

Sports magazines published in the United Kingdom
Caving mass media
Magazines established in 1969
Caving in the United Kingdom
1969 establishments in the United Kingdom
Bi-monthly magazines published in the United Kingdom